"Put a Date on It" is a song by American rapper Yo Gotti featuring American rapper Lil Baby. It was released on January 25, 2019, and served as the lead single from his Gotti's tenth studio album Untrapped. The song features a songwriting credit from fellow rapper Moneybagg Yo.

Composition 
The song is composed in E major. Its instrumental features a brass instrument.

Music video 
The music video was released on January 28, 2019.

Charts

Weekly charts

Year-end charts

Certifications

References 

2019 singles
2019 songs
Yo Gotti songs
Lil Baby songs
Songs written by Lil Baby
Songs written by Yo Gotti
Songs written by June James (record producer)